Dixophlebia quadristrigata is a moth of the subfamily Arctiinae. It was described by Francis Walker in 1864. It is found in Brazil (Tefé, Minas Gerais).

References

Arctiinae
Moths described in 1864